Enzo Biagi (9 August 1920 – 6 November 2007) was an Italian journalist, writer and former partisan.

Life and career
Biagi was born in Lizzano in Belvedere, and began his career as a journalist in Bologna. In 1952, he worked on the screenplay of the historical film Red Shirts. In 1953, he became the editor-in-chief of Epoca magazine.

Active in journalism for six decades and author of some eighty books, Biagi won numerous awards, among which were the 1979 Saint Vincent prize and the 1985 Ischia International Journalism Award. In 1987, he won the Premio Bancarella for his book Il boss è solo, interviewing former Sicilian Mafia boss Tommaso Buscetta, who had turned pentito (state witness). He worked on the Italian national TV channel Rai Uno until 2001.

On 9 May 2001, just two days before the general elections in Italy, during his daily prime time 10-minute TV show Il Fatto, broadcast on Rai Uno, Biagi interviewed the popular actor and director Roberto Benigni, who gave a hilarious talk about Silvio Berlusconi declaring his preference for the other candidate, Francesco Rutelli from the Olive Tree coalition.

The Bulgarian Edict 
Biagi disappeared from TV screens a few months after Berlusconi's declarations in Sofia named also Editto Bulgaro, where the then-Prime Minister accused the popular journalist, together with fellow journalist Michele Santoro and showman/comedian Daniele Luttazzi, of having made criminal use of the public television service.

Biagi's defenders argue that a public service should provide pluralism, and that a country where government prevents opposing ideas from being voiced on air is a régime.

The issue of Berlusconi's motives for entering politics in the first place emerged in an interview that he gave with Biagi and Indro Montanelli, stating "If I don't enter politics, I will go to jail and become bankrupt."

Biagi's return on TV and death 
On 22 April 2007, 86-year-old Enzo Biagi made his TV comeback on the RAI with RT - Rotocalco Televisivo, a current affairs show which is broadcast on Raitre. At the opening of the show, he declared:

Until shortly before his death he was also a columnist for the daily Italian newspaper Corriere della Sera, which he had worked for since the early 1970s.

References

External links
Obituary in The Times, 1 December 2007
"RT - Rotocalco Televisivo" website 
Enzo Biagi, a political affair 
"Il fatto" di Enzo Biagi ("The event" by Enzo Biagi) 
Associated Press: Enzo Biagi obituary (Published Nov. 6, 2007)

1920 births
2007 deaths
People from the Province of Bologna
Italian anti-fascists
Action Party (Italy) politicians
Italian resistance movement members
Members of Giustizia e Libertà
Italian television journalists
Bancarella Prize winners
20th-century Italian politicians
Italian magazine editors
Knights Grand Cross of the Order of Merit of the Italian Republic
Recipients of Ischia International Journalism Award